Bosanquet is a surname. Notable people with the surname include:

 Bernard Bosanquet (philosopher) (1848–1923), English philosopher
 Bernard Bosanquet (cricketer) (1877–1936), English cricketer, credited with inventing the googly, a bowling technique
 Caroline Bosanquet (1940–2013), British cellist, music teacher and composer
 Charles Bosanquet (1769–1850), English official and writer
 Charles Ion Carr Bosanquet (1903–1986), first Vice-Chancellor of Newcastle University
 Admiral Sir Day Hort Bosanquet (1843–1923), 16th Governor of South Australia
 Sir Frederick Albert Bosanquet, KC, JP (1837–1923), Common Serjeant of London
 Helen Bosanquet (1860–1926), English social theorist and social reformer
 Jacob Bosanquet Jr. (1755–1828), High Sheriff of Hertfordshire and Chairman of the East India Company
 James Whatman Bosanquet (1804–1877), English banker and writer on biblical chronology
 Honourable Sir John Bosanquet KS PC (1773–1847), British judge
 Lancelot Stephen Bosanquet (1903–1984), English mathematician
 Reginald Bosanquet (1932–1984), British journalist and broadcaster
 Robert Carr Bosanquet (1871–1935), British archaeologist
 Robert Holford Macdowall Bosanquet (1841–1913), English scientist and music theorist
 Samuel Richard Bosanquet (1800–1882), English barrister and writer on legal, social and theological topics
 Theodora Bosanquet (1880–1961), British amanuensis and editor, 
 William Cecil Bosanquet (1866–1941), English physician